Octet is a chamber choir musical written and composed by Dave Malloy and directed by Annie Tippe. The show "explores addiction and nihilism within the messy context of 21st century technology."

Synopsis
Eight Internet addicts gather in a support group called "Friends of Saul" in a church basement and share their stories, in a score for an a cappella chamber choir and an original libretto inspired by internet comment boards, scientific debates, religious texts, and Sufi poetry.

Musical numbers
The musical is structured around a series of hymns and "shares," as the group members explain their relationship to technology. Each song corresponds to one of the Major Arcana, the picture cards in a tarot deck.

Part 1
 I. "Hymn: The Forest" - All
 II. "Refresh" - Jessica & Chorus
 III. "Candy" - Henry & Chorus
 IV. "Glow" - Paula
 V. "Fugue State" - All

Part 2
 VI. "Hymn: Monster" - Women, All
 VII. "Solo" - Karla, Ed, All
 VIII. "Actually" - Toby, Chorus
 IX. "Little God" - Marvin, Chorus
 X. "Tower Tea Ceremony" - All
 XI. "Beautiful" - Velma
 XII. "Hymn: The Field" - All

Productions
The piece premiered on May 19, 2019, at Off-Broadway at the Signature Theatre in New York City. It was extended three times in June, ultimately finishing on June 30.

The production was Directed by Annie Tippe, with Music Supervision & Music Direction by Or Matias, Scenic Design by Amy Rubin & Brittany Vasta, Costume Design by Brenda Abbandandolo, Lighting Design by Christopher Bowser, Sound Design by Hidenori Nakajo, and Production Stage Management by Jhanaë Bonnick

Octet had its West Coast premiere at Berkeley Repertory Theatre on April 20, 2022, once again directed by Annie Tippe. It is running until May 29, 2022.

Roles and principal casts

Influences
The program's bibliography cites several sources of inspiration, including:

Text
Douglas Adams, The Hitchhiker’s Guide to the Galaxy; Sherwood Anderson, Winesburg, Ohio; 
John Cage, Silence; 
Nicholas Carr, The Shallows; 
Chuang-Tzu; 
Ernest Cline, Ready Player One; 
Richard Dawkins, The God Delusion; 
Philip K. Dick, Valis; 
James Gleick, The Information; 
Jonathan Haidt, The Righteous Mind; 
Ray Kurzweil, The Singularity Is Near; 
C. S. Lewis, The Screwtape Letters; 
Angela Nagle, Kill All Normies; 
Michael Pollan, How to Change Your Mind; 
Catherine Price, How to Break Up with Your Phone; 
Jon Ronson, So You've Been Publicly Shamed; 
Rumi, “A Great Wagon”; 
George Saunders, Tenth of December; 
Wallace Shawn, Essays; 
Neal Stephenson, Snow Crash; 
Alan Watts, The Book; 
Walt Whitman, Leaves of Grass; 
Pete Walker, Complex PTSD: From Surviving to ThrivingTheater
Caryl Churchill, Love and Information; 
Marvin Hamlisch, Edward Kleban, James Kirkwood Jr. & Nicholas Dante, A Chorus Line; 
Stephen Sondheim & George Furth, CompanyTarotThe Rider–Waite–Smith Tarot; 
Kim Krans, The Wild Unknown TarotFilmAltered States; 
Black Mirror: S01E03 “The Entire History of You”; S03E01 “Nosedive”; S03E06 “Hated in the Nation”; 
Blade Runner; 
The Matrix; 
My Dinner with Andre

Podcasts
Reply All; 
Dear Sugar

Games
Candy Crush; Cookie Clicker; Everything; Inside; Journey; Universal Paperclips; The Witness; World of Warcraft

Music
Robert Ashley, Perfect Lives; 
Luciano Berio, Sinfonia; 
Philip Glass, Einstein on the Beach; 
Meredith Monk, Dolmen Music; 
Nico Muhly, Two Boys, Mothertongue; 
Sacred Harp; 
Caroline Shaw, Partita for 8 Voices; 
Toby Twining, Chrysalid Requiem

Critical response

The piece was well received by the New York press. Ben Brantley of the New York Times  calling it "a sublime chamber opera" that "promises to be the most original and topical musical of the year." He praised the performers as "uniformly excellent" and whose "layered and contrapuntal voices produce a dazzling spectrum of effects". Sara Holdren of Vulture wrote that "Octet is that rare and thrilling thing: a new musical that really does feel new. Formally, it’s both unique and invigorating — and it’s rigorous and straightforward enough in its structure for its ideas to spiral into rich, dense fractals. In the face of a virtual world where “there’s no coming back / No rehabilitation / No nuance / Just noise,” it takes a bravely unequivocal yet generous stand. It sings of darkness, blindness, and fear, but it sings also of complexity, connection, redemption, and hope." Adam Feldman of Time Out New York gave Octet 5 ouf of 5 stars and wrote: "Under Annie Tippe’s taut direction, all eight bits of Octet’s byte-size cast perform Malloy’s challenging compositions with exceptional skill, abetted by Or Matias’s musical direction and Hidenori Nakajo’s sound design. As Broadway shows increasingly rely on massive spectacle, Octet proves that well-polished pieces of eight are enough." David Cote of Observer wrote that it was not only "one of the most thought-provoking and soul-stirring musicals I’ve seen in ages, it has an ingeniously woven, harmonically lush score that you’ll want to revisit."

Awards and nominations

Original Off-Broadway production

Cast recording
A cast recording was released on November 15, 2019 following a Kickstarter campaign.

References

Further reading 

 
 
 

Off-Broadway musicals
2019 musicals
Musicals by Dave Malloy
Mass media about Internet culture
Plays about religion and science
Tarot in fiction
Existentialist plays
Kickstarter-funded albums
Drama Desk Award-winning musicals
Obie Award-winning plays